Theo Eble (1899–1974) was a Swiss painter.

References
This article was initially translated from the German Wikipedia.
 

20th-century Swiss painters
Swiss male painters
1899 births
1974 deaths
20th-century Swiss male artists